Eiswelt Stuttgart is a multipurpose indoor arena in the Waldau neighborhood of Stuttgart, Germany. It is home to the Stuttgart Rebels ice hockey team of the Regionalliga Süd-West.

History
The Eissportzentrum Waldau was built in 1961 by the TEC Waldau hockey club as an open-air rink and was taken over by the city of Stuttgart on December 6, 1962. It was roofed over in 1977 and extensively renovated in 2011. The arena has a capacity of 3,000 spectators since the renovation in 2011.

Gallery

References

External links
 Eiswelt Stuttgart at stuttgart.de
 Eissport-Zentrum Waldau at hockeyarenas.net

Sports venues completed in 2008
Indoor arenas in Germany
Indoor ice hockey venues in Germany
Buildings and structures in Stuttgart
1961 establishments in West Germany